This is a list of television programs broadcast by France 2.

Current

News 

 Complément d'enquête (since 2001)
 Consomag (since 1965)
 Envoyé spécial (since 1990)
 Expression directe 
 Faites entrer l'accusé 
 Journal
 L'Émission politique
 Télématin
 Un œil sur la planète (2002-2017)
 French Presidential Debates (since 1988)

Magazine 
 30 millions d'amis (2004-2006)
 Actuality (2016-2017)
 C'est au programme (1998-2019)

Documentaries 
 Les pouvoirs extraordinaires du corps humain (since 2012)
 Rendez-vous en terre inconnue (since 2006)
 Secrets d'Histoire (2007-2019)

Sports 

 Coupe de la Ligue (until 2020)
 Coupe de France (until 2022)
 Olympic Games
 Stade 2 (1975-2019)
 Tour de France
 Roland-Garros

Entertainment 

 La Chance aux chansons (1991-2000)
 Le plus grand cabaret du monde (1998-2019)
 Les années bonheur (2006-2019)
 Prodiges (since 2014)
 Taratata (since 1993)
 Vivement dimanche (1998-2022)
 Drag Race France (since 2022)
 MasterChef France (since 2022)

Game shows 

 Fort Boyard (since 1990)
 N'oubliez pas les paroles! (since 2007)
 Tout le monde veut prendre sa place (since 2006)
 Chacun son tour (since 2021)

Talk shows 

 Amanda (2016-2017)
 Ça commence aujourd'hui (since 2018)
 Ça se discute (1994-2009)
 Campus
 Double je
 Mots croisés
 L'émission pour tous (2014) 
 On a tout essayé (2000-2007)
 On n'est pas couché (2006-2020)
 Thé ou Café (1996-2018)
 Tout le monde en parle (1998-2006)
 Toute une histoire (2006-2016)
 On est en direct (2020-2022)

Music 

 Eurovision Song Contest
 Junior Eurovision Song Contest
 Les victoires de la musique
 Top of the pops

TV series 

 A Cops (Un Flic série)
 Agatha Christie's Poirot (Hercule Poirot)
 Broadchurch (Broadchurch)
 Castle (Castle)
 The Closer (The Closer : L.A enquêtes prioritaires)
 Cœur océan (Cœur océan)
 Committed (Marni et Nate)
 Fais pas ci, fais pas ça (Fais pas ci, fais pas ça)
 Grounded for Life (Parents à tout prix)
 Major Crimes (Major Crimes)
 Minuit, le soir (Minuit, le soir)
 The O.C. (Newport Beach)
 Rizzoli & Isles (Rizzolli and Isles : Autopsie d'un Meurtre)
 Sherlock (Sherlock)
 Témoins (Witnesses)
 Water Rats (Brigade Des Mers)
 Without a Trace (FBI : Portés disparus)
 Private Practice (Private Practice)
Candice Renoir

Dramas 
 Band of Brothers 
 Bardot
 Boomtown 
 Boston Public 
 Cold Case 
 La crim''' 
 The District (Washington Police) 
 ER (Urgences) 
 Fastlane 
 JAG 
 PJ 
 Spin 
 Third Watch (New York 911) 
 Without a Trace (FBI: Portés Disparus)

 Soap operas 
 The Bold and the Beautiful (Amour, gloire et beauté)
 Days of Our Lives (Des jours et des vies)
 Un si grand soleil (since 2018)

 Sitcoms 
 Friends 
 Samantha oups! The Fresh Prince Of Bel-Air Former 

 Game shows 

 60 secondes du Colisée (2007)
 Les Bons génies (1996)
 Avec ou sans joker (2013)
 Carbone 14 (2006)
 Chéri(e), fais les valises ! (2011)
 Code de la route (2003-2004, 2011)
 Des chiffres et des lettres (1965-2006)
 Dingbats (1992)
 En toutes lettres (2009-2011)
 Et 1, et 2, et 3 ! (1999)
 Face à la bande (2014)
 Intervilles (2004-2005-2013)
 Jeux sans frontières (1965-1999)
 Joker (2015-2016)
 La Cible (2003-2007)
 La Gym des neurones (2000-2002)
 La Part du lion (2007)
 La télé est à vous ! (2009-2010)
 Le 4e Duel (2008-2013)
 Le Brise-cœur (2004)
 Le Coffre (2003-2004)
 Le Cube (2013)
 Le Grand Blind Test (2003)
 Le Jeu (1992-1993)
 Le Juste Euro (2001-2002)
 Le Numéro gagnant (2001-2002)
 Les Bons génies (1996)
 Les Cinglés de la télé (1999)
 Les Forges du désert (1999-2000)
 Les Trésors du monde (1994)
 Le Trophée Campus (1995)
 Les Z'amours (1995-2021)
 Millionnaire (2004-2008)
 Mot de passe (2009-2016, 2020-2021)
 Motus (1990-2019)
 N'oubliez pas votre brosse à dents (1994-1996)
 Passe à ton voisin (1997)
 Pop Show (2015-2016)
 Presto! (2008-2011)
 Pyramide (1991-2003, 2014-2015)
 Que le meilleur gagne (1992-1995, 2012, 2014)
 Qui est le bluffeur ? (2006)
 Qui est qui ? (1996-2002)
 Réveillez vos méninges (2010-2011)
 Seriez-vous un bon expert ? (2011-2013)
 Slam (2009)
 Tout vu tout lu (2003-2006)
 Trivial Pursuit (2002-2003)
 Un mot peut en cacher un autre (2015-2016)
 Un pour tous (1993)
 Volte-face'' (2012)

Sports 

 Davis Cup (until 2018)

External links

 Informations and programs at programmes.france2.fr [in French) 

 
France 2